Men's Greco-Roman 84 kilograms competition at the 2008 Summer Olympics in Beijing, China, was held on August 14 at the China Agricultural University Gymnasium. Italian wrestler Andrea Minguzzi won the gold medal in this event.

This Greco-Roman wrestling competition consists of a single-elimination tournament, with a repechage used to determine the winner of two bronze medals. The two finalists face off for gold and silver medals. Each wrestler who loses to one of the two finalists moves into the repechage, culminating in a pair of bronze medal matches featuring the semifinal losers each facing the remaining repechage opponent from their half of the bracket.

Each bout consists of up to three rounds, lasting two minutes apiece. The wrestler who scores more points in each round is the winner of that rounds; the bout ends when one wrestler has won two rounds (and thus the match).

Schedule
All times are China Standard Time (UTC+08:00)

Results

Final

Top half

Bottom half

Repechage

Final standing

 Ara Abrahamian of Sweden originally won a bronze medal, but he was disqualified after he walked off the podium and placed his medal onto the mat at the medal ceremony to protest the judging in his semi-final match. The IOC decided not to reaward the medal as Abrahamian's offence did not occur in the context of the competition.

Controversy
Pelle Svensson, a former two-time world champion in Greco-Roman and member of board of FILA from 1990 to 2007, spoke out in support of the allegations of corruption during the semifinals in the men's Greco-Roman wrestling 84 kg at the 2008 Summer Olympics in Beijing, when Ara Abrahamian lost against Andrea Minguzzi from Italy after a controversial ruling by the referee. It was later reported that the referee of the match, Jean-Marc Petoud from Switzerland, is a first cousin of the current President of FILA Raphaël Martinetti. Abrahamian, who was stripped of his bronze medal in the 2008 Beijing Summer Olympics after dropping the medal in protest, has received a level of vindication through the Court of Arbitration for Sport (CAS).  His protest revolved around a second round bout with Italian Andrea Minguzzi, where a penalty wasn't assessed until after the round had concluded.  Abrahamian's coach was denied a chance to review the call via video, and FILA also refused an official protest from the coach. Minguzzi later took gold in the event.

The IOC decided not to award French wrestler Mélonin Noumonvi the bronze medal because the disqualification did not happen in the context of the competition.

References 

Results Book, Page 9

Wrestling at the 2008 Summer Olympics
Men's events at the 2008 Summer Olympics